Derek Lyle Keys (30 August 1931 – 29 April 2018) was a South African politician who served as Minister of Finance from 1992 to September 1994, in the cabinets of F. W. de Klerk and Nelson Mandela.

Early life
Born in Johannesburg, he attended the University of Witwatersrand were he graduated with a Bachelor of Commerce degree in 1950. By 1954, he qualified as a chartered accountant.

Career
Keys joined the Industrial Development Corporation of South Africa in 1956. In the subsequent eight years he was involved in the development of many of the major South African industries. Until 1986 Keys played largely advisory roles for several international and local companies operating in South Africa as a management consultant. During these 21 years he joined the boards of, among others, Asea, Sandvik, and Sappi.

Prior to becoming a cabinet minister, he had been the executive chairman of Gencor from 1986 until 1991.

In December 1991 Keys was appointed Minister of Economic Co-ordination and of Trade and Industry. In May 1992, the portfolio of Minister of Finance was added to Keys' tasks. He had previously served on government bodies in an advisory capacity, including the Commission for electricity, the Tax Advisory Committee and the State Presidents' Economic Advisory Council.

Keys resigned shortly on 6 July 1994, and was replaced by banker Chris Liebenberg on 19 September.

References

1931 births
2018 deaths
White South African people
Finance ministers of South Africa
National Party (South Africa) politicians
People from Johannesburg